Jerold Auerbach (born 1936) is an American historian and professor emeritus of history at Wellesley College.

Auerbach earned the B.A. at Oberlin College and the Ph.D. at Columbia University in 1965.  He taught at Queens College and at Brandeis University before joining the Wellesley faculty in 1971.

Writing in the Harvard Law Review, Judge Charles Edward Wyzanski, Jr., described Auerbach's Unequal Justice (1976) as having, "a cogency built on careful scholarship not impaired by fanaticism." Not all reviews were as complimentary. Yale Law School professor Joseph W. Bishop, writing in Commentary, accused Auerbach of having "marred his argument by suggestion of the false, suppression of the true, distortion of his adversaries' arguments, and the frequent use of half-truth and sometimes simple untruth". A New York Times book review by Harvard law professor Alan Dershowitz was more favorable.

Books
 Print to Fit: The New York Times, Zionism and Israel (1896-2016) (Academic Studies Press, 2019)
 Against the Grain: A Historian's Journey, (Quid Pro Books, 2012)
 Brothers at War: Israel and the Tragedy of the Altalena, (Quid Pro Books, 2011)
 Hebron Jews: Memory and Conflict in the Land of Israel, (Rowman & Littlefield, 2009)
 Explorers in Eden: Pueblo Indians and the Promised Land, (New Mexico, 2006)
 Are We One? Jewish Identity in the United States and Israel, (Rutgers, 2001)
 Jacob's Voices, (Southern Illinois, 1996)
 Rabbis and Lawyers, (Indiana, 1990)
 Justice Without Law? (Oxford, 1983)
 Unequal Justice: Lawyers and Social Change in Modern America. (Oxford, 1976)
 Labor and Liberty. (Bobbs-Merrill, 1969)

References

1936 births
Living people
21st-century American historians
21st-century American male writers
Wellesley College faculty
Oberlin College alumni
Columbia University alumni
Queens College, City University of New York faculty
Brandeis University faculty
American male non-fiction writers